The bitterling-like cyprinids form the cyprinid subfamily Acheilognathinae. This subfamily contains four genera, although the Khanka spiny bitterling is often placed in Acheilognathus, and at least 71 described species to date. Over half of the species are in the genus Acheilognathus.

Genera contained herein are:
Acanthorhodeus – Khanka spiny bitterling
Acheilognathus (42 species)
Paratanakia (monotypic)
Pseudorhodeus (monotypic)
Rhodeus – (typical) bitterlings (21 species)
Tanakia (7 species)
Sinorhodeus (monotypic)

References

 
Ray-finned fish subfamilies